Mikael Bo Andersson (born 6 July 1959 in Jukkasjärvi, Sweden) is a retired Swedish ice hockey player. He is currently the sports manager and head coach of IF Björklöven in HockeyAllsvenskan.

Career statistics

Regular season and playoffs

International

External links 
 

1959 births
Living people
Frölunda HC players
Ice hockey players at the 1988 Winter Olympics
Olympic bronze medalists for Sweden
Olympic ice hockey players of Sweden
Olympic medalists in ice hockey
People from Kiruna Municipality
Swedish ice hockey forwards
Sportspeople from Norrbotten County